Alan Thomas Preen (4 July 1935 – 27 November 2016) was a sportsman who played Australian rules football with East Fremantle in the WANFL and first-class cricket for Western Australia during the 1950s. He is a half forward flanker in East Fremantle's official 'Team of the Century'.

Preen was mainly a centre half forward but could also be used in the ruck. He played at East Fremantle between 1953 and 1959, a career which yielded 122 senior games with Best and fairest award wins in 1954 and 1958 as well as a premiership in 1957. He regularly represented Western Australia at interstate football, in all playing 15 state games, with his performance in 1958 earning him All-Australian selection.

As a cricketer, Preen was a left-arm medium-pace bowler and from his 13 first-class matches from 1953–54 to 1956–57 took 28 wickets at 34.96. His best innings bowling figures of 6/97 were taken against Victoria at the St Kilda Cricket Ground and included the wickets of Neil Harvey, Sam Loxton and Colin McDonald.

Preen died on 27 November 2016 after a long illness.

References

External links

1935 births
2016 deaths
East Fremantle Football Club players
All-Australians (1953–1988)
West Australian Football Hall of Fame inductees
Australian cricketers
Western Australia cricketers
Cricketers from Western Australia
Australian rules footballers from Fremantle